Gołkowice Dolne  is a village in the administrative district of Gmina Stary Sącz, within Nowy Sącz County, Lesser Poland Voivodeship, in southern Poland.

The village has a population of 890.

The village Gołkowice was first mentioned in 1276. Beginning in 1784, 37 German families were settled here in the course of the Josephine colonization.

References

Villages in Nowy Sącz County